Kiskorpád is a village in Somogy county, Hungary.

Geography
It lies 14 km west of Kaposvár, next to the road 61 and the Dombóvár-Gyékényes Railway Line.

History
It was first mentioned as Villa Curpad in 1324 in an official document. The papal tithe registration refers to the village as a settlement with a parish. During the Turkish occupation it appears in the tax registration of the Ottoman Porte. In the beginning of 18th century its name was Pusztakorbád and its landowners were the Sárközy, Visy and Tallián families. According to László Szita the settlement was completely Hungarian in the 18th century.

In 1798-1799 Mihály Csokonai Vitéz was the guest of the Sárközy family who wrote several of his well known poems there. In the 20th century there was a steam mill, a cement and a tile factory.

Main sights
 Reformed Church (built in late Baroque style in 1789
 Kapotsfy Chapel 
 River Kapos has its source in the village
 Lake Szigetes (fish pond)

Notable residents
 Lajos Kozma (1884 - 1948), Hungarian architect, industrial designer, graphic artist
 János Hóvári (born 1955), Hungarian historian, turkologist, diplomat

Gallery

Literature
 László Szita : Somogy megyei nemzetiségek településtörténete a XVIII-XIX. században - Somogyi Almanach 52. (Kaposvár, 1993)

External links 
 Street map (Hungarian)

References 

Populated places in Somogy County